This page is a list of higher education institutions in Karnataka that grant academic degrees. This page lists Institutes of National Importance, Institutes of Eminence, Central Universities, Deemed Universities, State Universities and Private Universities.

Institutes of National Importance

Institutes of Eminence 

Indian Institute of Science is considered as deemed to be university.

Universities

Central

State

Private

Deemed to be University

References

Lists of universities and colleges in Karnataka